Kate Georgia Anderson (born 6 May 1996) is a New Zealand cricketer who currently plays for Canterbury. In April 2021, Anderson earned her maiden call-up to the New Zealand women's cricket team, for their Women's One Day International (WODI) matches against Australia, after New Zealand's captain Sophie Devine was ruled out of the series. She has previously played for Northern Districts.

References

1996 births
Living people
Cricketers from Invercargill
New Zealand women cricketers
Northern Districts women cricketers
Canterbury Magicians cricketers